Handia is a constituency of the Uttar Pradesh Legislative Assembly covering the city of Handia in the Allahabad district of Uttar Pradesh, India.

Handia is one of five assembly constituencies in the Bhadohi Lok Sabha constituency. Since 2008, this assembly constituency is numbered 258 amongst 403 constituencies.

Members of Legislative Assembly 

Hakim Lal Bind from 2017
Prashant Singh 2013-2017 (by-polls)
Mahesh Narayan Singh (2012-2013)
Rakesh Dhar Tripathi (2007-2012)
Mahesh Narayan Singh (2002-2007)
Rakesh Dhar Tripathi (1996-2002)
Jokhu Lal Yadav (1993-1996)
Brij Bhan Yadav (1991-1993)
Rakesh Dhar Tripathi (1989-1991)
Rakesh Dhar Tripathi (1985-1989)
Ranendra Tripathi (1980-1985)
Athai Ram (1977-1980)
Athai Ram (1974-1977)
Rajit Ram (1969-1974)
A.Ram (1967-1969)

Election results

2022

2017
Bahujan Samaj Party candidate Hakim Lal Bind won in 2017 Uttar Pradesh Legislative Elections defeating Apna Dal (Sonelal) candidate Pramila Devi by a margin of 8,526 votes.

References

External links
 

Assembly constituencies of Uttar Pradesh
Politics of Allahabad district